Siella may refer to:

Berula
Siella, Mali